{{DISPLAYTITLE:C16H19N3S}}
The molecular formula C16H19N3S (molar mass: 285.41 g/mol, exact mass: 285.1300 u) may refer to:

 Isothipendyl
 Prothipendyl, also known as azophenothiazine or phrenotropin

Molecular formulas